Panni or Parni refers to a Pashtun tribe in Afghanistan and Pakistan. Another name for the tribe is Balailzai. Like other Pashtuns, they have Eastern Iranian genetic and ethnolinguistic heritage. They claim descent from Gharghasht. Most of them are settled in parts of Pakistan or Afghanistan, such as Karachi, Quetta, Musakhail, Dera Ismail Khan, Mardan, Peshawar, Haripur, Kabul, Tank, Kohat, Sibi, while there are some communities in the United States, United Kingdom, and other Western countries. They were, at one point in time, holding main posts in the Government especially during the rule of Bahlol Lodhi. After his reign ended, they scattered and migrated to various parts of the Indian subcontinent and the Middle East.  Some Pannis have also migrated to South India. However, most of them are settled in Pakistan. The Zamindars of Karatia in Bangladesh are of Panni descent.

References

http://www.scribd.com/doc/32595536/Panni-Pathan-a-book-of-history-with-Bibliography
http://www.sibidistrict.com/ Sibi District panni Tribes

Gharghashti Pashtun tribes
Pashto-language surnames
Pakistani names
Social groups of Pakistan